Aytoun is a surname of Scottish origin. Notable people with the surname include:

Andrew Aytoun (died 1547), Scottish soldier and engineer
George Aytoun (born 1880), Scottish footballer
Robert Aytoun (1570–1638), Scottish poet
Roger Aytoun (died 1810), British soldier
Roger Sinclair Aytoun (1823–1904), Scottish politician
William Edmondstoune Aytoun (1813–1865), Scottish poet, humorist, and writer

See also
Aiton (surname)
Ayton (surname)

References

Surnames of Scottish origin